The Western Athletic Conference Men's Basketball Player of the Year is a basketball award given to the Western Athletic Conference's (WAC) most outstanding player. The award was first given following the 1980–81 season. Keith Van Horn of Utah and Nick Fazekas of Nevada are the only players to have won the award three times. Three other players—Michael Cage, Josh Grant and Melvin Ely—have won the award twice. Danny Ainge, the first ever WAC Player of the Year, was also the John R. Wooden Award winner in 1980–81.

Utah has the most all-time winners with seven. There have been four ties in the award's history, most notably in 1982–83 when there was a three-way tie. Due mainly to major membership turnover from 2010 to 2014 and further turnover in the early 2020s, only two schools that will be WAC members after the 2022–23 season—California Baptist and Utah Valley—have had a winner.

Key

Winners

Winners by school

Footnotes

References

NCAA Division I men's basketball conference players of the year
Player
Awards established in 1981